Before Midnight is a 2013 American romantic drama film directed by Richard Linklater, who co-wrote the screenplay with Ethan Hawke and Julie Delpy. The sequel to Before Sunrise (1995) and Before Sunset (2004), it is the third installment in the Before trilogy. The film follows Jesse (Hawke) and Céline (Delpy), now a couple, as they spend a summer vacation in Greece with their children.

Linklater, Hawke, and Delpy began developing a third film in 2011, wishing to replicate the nine-year gap between the first two installments. Principal photography began in August 2012, and took place entirely on the Peloponnese coast in Southern Greece, including the Kardamyli home once owned by author Patrick Leigh Fermor. Like its predecessors, Before Midnight has a minimal plot, with considerable screentime devoted to extended conversations between the characters.

Before Midnight premiered at the Sundance Film Festival on January 20, 2013. It began a domestic limited release on May 24, 2013, and went on general release on June 14, 2013. It grossed $23 million worldwide, becoming the highest-grossing film in the trilogy. It received widespread critical acclaim, particularly for its exploration of romance and age, its screenplay, Linklater's direction, and acting performances. The film garnered many accolades and was nominated for the Academy Award for Best Adapted Screenplay, the Writers Guild of America Award for Best Adapted Screenplay, and the Golden Globe Award for Best Actress – Motion Picture Comedy or Musical for Delpy.

Plot
Nine years since rekindling their relationship, Jesse and Céline have become parents to twin girls. Jesse reflects on his inability to maintain his relationship with his teenage son, Hank. Hank flies home to Chicago after vacationing with the couple and their children on the Greek Peloponnese peninsula, and lives with his mother, Jesse's ex-wife.

Jesse is a successful novelist, while Céline is at a career crossroads, considering a job with the French government. The couple discuss their concerns over Hank, as well as Céline's career, and reflect on love and life over dinner with friends. Their friends pay for a hotel room for the couple; while walking to the hotel, Jesse and Céline reminisce about their initial meetings, and wonder if they would become a couple if they met in their present state.

After reaching the hotel, they begin to get intimate but are interrupted by a phone call from Hank, who seems to have bonded with Céline more than Jesse. They eventually have a fierce argument, expressing fears about the strength of their relationship. Jesse wants them to consider moving to Chicago so he can be closer to Hank, which Céline thinks will cost her any chance of a career outside her family. During the argument, Céline leaves and returns twice. Then she tells Jesse she thinks she no longer loves him.

Céline leaves their room the third time and sits alone in the hotel's outdoor restaurant. Jesse joins her and jokes that he is a time traveler (referencing their first meeting), bringing her a letter from her 82-year-old self, describing this night as one of the best of their lives. Unamused, Céline says their fantasies will never match the imperfect reality. Jesse says while their love may be imperfect, it is real. After a moment, Céline joins in Jesse's joke, and the two reconcile.

Cast

Production
Richard Linklater, Ethan Hawke, and Julie Delpy had all discussed doing a sequel to Before Sunset (or the third in a trilogy). In November 2011, Hawke said that he, Delpy and Linklater
"have been talking a lot in the last six months. All three of us have been having similar feelings, that we're kind of ready to revisit those characters. There's nine years between the first two movies and, if we made the film next summer, it would be nine years again, so we started thinking that would be a good thing to do. So we're going to try and write it this year."

In June 2012, Hawke confirmed that the sequel to Before Sunset would be filmed that summer. Soon after, Delpy denied filming would take place that year. By that August, numerous reports emerged from Messenia, Greece, that the film was being shot there. The completion of the sequel, Before Midnight, was announced on September 5, 2012. Linklater said that, after ten weeks of writing and rehearsing, the film was made in 15 days for less than $3 million. He announced plans to premiere the film at a festival in early 2013.

Release
Before Midnight premiered on January 20, 2013, at the 2013 Sundance Film Festival. It had its international premiere out of competition at the 63rd Berlin International Film Festival.

The film opened to general audiences on May 24, 2013, at five theaters in New York, Los Angeles, and Austin, Texas. It was released wide in 897 theaters on June 14, 2013.

Box office
The film grossed $8,110,621 domestically and $15,141,309 internationally, for a worldwide gross of $23,251,930.

Critical reception
Like the previous entry of the trilogy, Before Midnight received widespread critical acclaim. Rotten Tomatoes gives the film a score of 98% based on reviews from 203 critics, with an average rating of 8.7/10. The site's consensus is: "Building on the first two installments in Richard Linklater's well-crafted Before trilogy, Before Midnight offers intelligent, powerfully acted perspectives on love, marriage, and long-term commitment." Metacritic gives the film a score of 94 out of 100, based on reviews from 41 critics, indicating "universal acclaim". It was listed as the third-best film of the year after 12 Years a Slave and Gravity. It was the second-best reviewed film of 2013 according to Rotten Tomatoes, after Alfonso Cuarón's Gravity.

According to Total Films Philip Kemp, "As with its two predecessors — and with the films of French New Wave director Éric Rohmer, presiding deity of this kind of cinema—Midnights essentially a film about people talking. But when the talk's this good, this absorbing and revealing and witty and true, who's going to complain?... [It's a] more-than-worthy, expectation-exceeding chapter in one of modern cinema's finest love stories. As honest, convincing, funny, intimate and natural as its predecessors."

Perry Seibert of AllMovie also praised the film, writing: "The screenwriting trio fill the movie with long, discursive conversations (there are only two scenes in the first 20 minutes) that feel utterly improvised when they are performed, but are far too deftly structured to be anything other than the work of consummate artists." Eric Kohn, from Indiewire, gave the film a rave review, adding it to his list of Top 10 Films of 2013. He wrote that "With Before Midnight, Richard Linklater has completed one of the finest movie trilogies of all time." Peter Bradshaw of The Guardian called the film "intimate and intelligent".

Accolades

 Each date is linked to the article about the awards held that year.

Top ten lists
According to Metacritic, the film appeared on the following critics' top 10 lists of 2013.

 1st – James Berardinelli, ReelViews
 1st – The A.V. Club
 1st – Chris Nashawaty, Entertainment Weekly
 1st – Stephen Holden, The New York Times
 1st – Justin Chang, Variety
 2nd – A.A. Dowd, The A.V. Club
 2nd – Nick Schager, The A.V. Club
 2nd – Total Film'''s 50 Best Movies of 2013
 2nd – E! 3rd – Lisa Schwarzbaum, BBC 3rd – 3 News 3rd – Owen Gleiberman, Entertainment Weekly 3rd – Eric Kohn, Indiewire 3rd – Film Comments 50 Best Films of 2013
 4th – Christopher Rosen & Mike Ryan, The Huffington Post 4th – Peter Travers, Rolling Stone 4th – Kristopher Tapleys, HitFix 5th – Robert Gifford, The Diamondback 6th – Sam Adams, The A.V. Club 6th – Marlow Stern, The Daily Beast 6th - Lukas Krycek, Comedian/Film Critic 
 7th – Stephanie Zacharek, The Village Voice 7th – Digital Spy 8th – Empire 8th – Scott MacDonald, The A.V. Club 8th – Chris Vognar, The Dallas Morning News 11th – Ben Kenigsberg, The A.V. Club 12th – Glenn Kenny's 30 Top Films of 2013
 14th – Ignatiy Vishnevetsky, The A.V. Club In alphabetical order – Manohla Dargis, The New York Times In alphabetical order – Dana Stevens, Slate Best films of 2013 – Peter Bradshaw, The Guardian Best movies of the year – David Denby, The New Yorker Best movies of 2013 – The WeekThe A.V. Club'' film critics named "The fight" scene the Scene of the Year.

Notes

Footnote
	
 The "Castle Rock Entertainment" logo does not appear in this film's opening.

References

External links

 
 "One couple - nearly 20 years - all before midnight", NPR, May 19, 2013
 Official screenplay at Sony Pictures Classics
 
 
 
 
 
 
 The Before Trilogy: Time Regained an essay by Dennis Lim at the Criterion Collection

2013 films
2013 romantic drama films
2010s English-language films
American sequel films
American independent films
American romantic drama films
Films directed by Richard Linklater
Films set in Greece
Films shot in Greece
Castle Rock Entertainment films
Films about conversations
Films about vacationing
Sony Pictures Classics films
2013 independent films
Before trilogy
2010s American films